The Grand is a 2008 improv comedy film directed by Zak Penn. The film has an ensemble cast including Ray Romano, Woody Harrelson, Chris Parnell, Werner Herzog, Jason Alexander, Dennis Farina, David Cross, Gabe Kaplan, Michael Karnow and Cheryl Hines along with several real Las Vegas poker stars.

According to Penn, the film is styled after those of Christopher Guest, in which each actor is given direction concerning their character and the actors are left to improvise each individual scene. The plot of The Grand was somewhat more open-ended than Guest's work, however. The focus of the film is a poker tournament played at the Golden Nugget in Las Vegas between the characters in which real poker matches were played by the actors as the scenes were filmed. The film's script did not specify the winner of the tournament, and the ending of the film was determined by the actual game played on set.

The film debuted at the Tribeca Film Festival, and was distributed by Anchor Bay Entertainment. The film opened in limited release in the United States on March 21, 2008, opened in wider release on April 4, 2008.

Plot
Jack Faro (Woody Harrelson) is a recovering drug addict who, after many relapses, decides to move into a rehabilitation facility full-time. Having been married 75 times, he is a serial husband and is always on the lookout for number 76. He enters The Grand, a Texas Hold 'Em poker tournament in Las Vegas created by his grandfather Lucky Faro (Barry Corbin). His main motivation is to win the $10 million prize to cover a loan he got to keep open his family's casino, The Rabbit's Foot, which his grandfather left him when he died and that he has mismanaged since.

The rest of the players "won" their seats in an online poker tournament. They include the Schwartzman twins, Larry (David Cross) and Lainie (Cheryl Hines), who have been forced into a sibling rivalry throughout their lives by their father, Seth (Gabe Kaplan). Another player, Harold Melvin (Chris Parnell), is a genius who still lives with his mother (Estelle Harris). Other contestants include Andy Andrews (Richard Kind), a math teacher, Deuce Fairbanks (Dennis Farina), a wily old veteran of Vegas, and "The German" (Werner Herzog), a cheater who ritualistically sacrifices small animals to gain luck at cards.

Cast
 Woody Harrelson – "One Eyed" Jack Faro (The Sentimental Favorite)
 Cheryl Hines – Lainie Schwartzman (The Woman)
 David Cross – Larry Schwartzman (The Bad Boy)
 Richard Kind – Andy Andrews (The Unknown)
 Chris Parnell – Harold Melvin (The Lonely Genius)
 Dennis Farina – Deuce Fairbanks (The Old Timer)
 Werner Herzog – The German
 Ray Romano – Fred Marsh
 Barry Corbin – Jiminy "Lucky" Faro
 Michael McKean – Steve Lavisch
 Gabe Kaplan – Seth Schwartzman
 Andrea Savage – Renee Jensen
 Estelle Harris – Ruth Melvin
 Michael Karnow – Mike Werbe
 Judy Greer – Sharon Andrews
 Randy Charach – Poker Player
 Jason Alexander – Yakov Achmed
 Brett Ratner – "Sob Story" Barry Blausteen
 Hank Azaria – Mike "The Bike" Neslo
 David Pressman – Melville "Murph Murph" Murphy
 Tom Hodges – Tim "Tiny Wonder" Woolrich
 Shannon Elizabeth – Toni
 K.D. Aubert – Julie the Waitress
 Mike Epps – Reggie Marshall
 Jeff Bowler – Poker Player
 Tom Lister Jr. – German's Bodyguard

Pro Poker player cameos
 Phil Gordon
 Doyle Brunson
 Daniel Negreanu
 Phil Laak
 Phil Hellmuth
 Antonio Esfandiari
 Richard Brodie

Critical reception
The film received mixed reviews from critics. On review aggregator Rotten Tomatoes, the film holds an approval rating of 40% based on 43 reviews, with an average rating of 5.2/10. The website's critics consensus reads: "The Grand has moments of comic ingenuity, but the jokes in this poker satire often miss." Metacritic reported the film had an average score of 57 out of 100, based on 23 reviews, indicating "mixed or average reviews".

See also
 List of films set in Las Vegas

References

External links
 
 
 
 

2007 films
2000s mockumentary films
Films about gambling
American mockumentary films
Films about poker
Films with screenplays by Zak Penn
2000s English-language films
Films directed by Zak Penn
2000s American films